Shitterton is a hamlet in Dorset, England. It has attracted worldwide attention for its name, which dates back at least 1000 years and means "farmstead on the stream used as an open sewer". Shitterton has frequently been noted on lists of unusual place names, due to having the vulgar term "shit" in its name. The hamlet includes a collection of historic thatched buildings dating back to the 18th century and earlier.

Location

Shitterton is located at the western edge of the village of Bere Regis in the Dorset district of Dorset, England, near the junction of the A31 and A35 trunk roads halfway between Poole and Dorchester. The hamlet has about 50 households. Because it was protected by the Bere River from the fires that have ravaged Bere Regis over the years (most notably in 1788), Shitterton still retains an extensive selection of older, predominantly thatched, buildings. Nikolaus Pevsner describes the hamlet as "the best part" of Bere Regis, with its buildings forming "its own little street" leading up to the 18th-century thatched Shitterton Farm.

Name

The unusual name of the hamlet dates back at least 1,000 years to Anglo-Saxon times. It was recorded in the Domesday Book of 1086 as Scatera or Scetra, a Norman French rendering of an Old English name derived from the word scite, meaning dung. This word became schitte in Middle English and shit in modern English. The name alludes to the stream that bisects the hamlet, which appears to have been called the Shiter or Shitter, or "brook used as a privy". The place-name therefore means something along the lines of "farmstead on the stream used as an open sewer". It has been recorded in a number of variants over the centuries, including Schitereston (1285), Shyterton (1332), Chiterton (1456) and Shetterton (1687). During the 19th century, Victorians attempted to rename the hamlet as Sitterton. The name did not stick, though it lingers on in a few house and road names such as Sitterton Close and Sitterton House. It is not the only place-name in Britain that starts with Shit- – Shittlehope and Shitlington Crags also exist, located in County Durham and Northumberland respectively – but it appears to be the only one to actually be named after excrement.

The stream which passes near the village flows into the River Piddle (also called River Trent). Piddle is another name for urine.

In 2012, Shitterton was voted "Britain's worst place-name" in a survey carried out by genealogy website Find My Past, beating Scratchy Bottom, also in Dorset, and Brokenwind in Aberdeenshire. It was also awarded ninth place on the list of place-names in Rude Britain: The 100 Rudest Place Names in Britain. The native Shittertonians are, however, proud of their hamlet's name. Ian Ventham, the chairman of the parish council, said: "It is a perfect rural hamlet with thatched cottages and idyllic Dorset countryside. Those of us who live here are not the least bit embarrassed by it."

Disappearing sign

The hamlet's name has resulted in its sign repeatedly being stolen (a fate similar to that of Fugging, Upper Austria), requiring costly replacements to be acquired each time, to the increasing reluctance of the local council. As Ian Ventham, chairman of Bere Regis Parish Council, put it:

In 2010, the inhabitants banded together to purchase a 1.5-tonne block of Purbeck Stone to place at the entrance to Shitterton, carved with the hamlet's name. More than half of the 50 households chipped in £20 each and a further £70 was contributed by Purbeck district council. A truck and crane were hired by volunteers to put the stone in place, at a total cost of £680. Ian Ventham explained: "We thought, 'Let's put in a tonne and a half of stone and see them try and take that away in the back of a Ford Fiesta'."

References

External links 
 Bere Regis village Web site
 Shit- place-names in England by Keith Briggs

Hamlets in Dorset
Purbeck District